George Abercromby, 2nd Baron Abercromby (14 October 1770 – 15 February 1843) was a Scottish lawyer, politician and peer. The eldest son of Lt.-Gen. Sir Ralph Abercromby and Mary Abercromby, 1st Baroness Abercromby, he became, like his grandfather, a lawyer, and was called to the Bar in 1794. On his death in 1843 he was succeeded in the barony by his son.

Career
He was a Whig Member of Parliament for Edinburgh, 1805–1806; and for Clackmannanshire, 1806–1807 and 1812–1815. On the death of his mother on 11 February 1821 he succeeded to the title of 2nd Baron Abercromby. He also inherited the estate of Airthrey from his uncle, Robert Abercromby of Airthrey, in 1827. He was Lord Lieutenant of Stirlingshire, 1837–1843 and, despite his age and illness, greeted Queen Victoria on her progress through Scotland in 1842. Upon his death, he was buried at Tullibody.

Family
He married Montague Dundas (born 30 April 1772), third daughter of Henry Dundas, 1st Viscount Melville and Elizabeth Rennie, in Edinburgh on 25 January 1799 and had issue:
George Ralph Campbell Abercromby, 3rd Baron Abercromby (1800–1852). Married 3 April 1832 Louisa-Penuel, b. 22 July 1810. (Daughter of John Hay-Forbes, a Lord of Session in the Justiciary of Scotland)
Montague Abercromby (1807–1853), married Fox Maule-Ramsay, 11th Earl of Dalhousie (1831)
Mary Ann Abercromby (1811–1898), married Col. N.R. Brown (1857)

References
thePeerage.com
Gazetteer for Scotland

External links 
 

1770 births
1843 deaths
2
Eldest sons of British hereditary barons
Members of the Parliament of the United Kingdom for Scottish constituencies
UK MPs 1802–1806
UK MPs 1806–1807
UK MPs 1812–1818
UK MPs who inherited peerages
Lord-Lieutenants of Stirlingshire
Whig (British political party) MPs for Scottish constituencies
Members of the Parliament of the United Kingdom for Edinburgh constituencies
George